The Bhagwan Mahavir World Peace Award is a prize from India given by Sarhad organization of Pune City, India. The award will be given every year within South Asian countries to honor the remarkably performed persons of who guard the dignity of human existence. As notably it has awarded to Nobel Peace Prize Laureate Aung San Suu Kyi in 2012 with a prize worth around 1,100,000 Indian Rupee. Sarhad is a non profit organisation dedicated to Peace and Humanity. Sarhad also serves in education , healthcare , rural and economic development

References

External links

Sarhad - non profit organisation
https://www.rediff.com/news/slide-show/slide-show-1-indias-troubled-border-is-ngo-sarhad-mission-field/20111019.htm
 Bhagwan Mahavir Award News
 DASSK Chosen one 2012
 Mahavir World Peace Award
 Sarhad organization
 Mahavir Award
https://www.outlookindia.com/newswire/story/aung-san-suu-kyi-chosen-for-bhagwan-mahavir-award/758222

Peace awards